The FA Cup 1971–72 is the 91st season of the world's oldest football knockout competition; The Football Association Challenge Cup, or FA Cup for short. The large number of clubs entering the tournament from lower down the English football league system meant that the competition started with a number of preliminary and qualifying rounds. The 28 victorious teams from the Fourth Round Qualifying progressed to the First Round Proper.

Preliminary round

Ties

Replays

1st qualifying round

Ties

Replays

2nd replay

2nd qualifying round

Ties

Replays

2nd replays

3rd qualifying round

Ties

Replays

2nd replay

4th qualifying round
The teams that given byes to this round are Macclesfield Town, Enfield, Bradford Park Avenue, Wimbledon, Yeovil Town, Hereford United, South Shields, Chelmsford City, Weymouth, Grantham, Oxford City, Barnet, Margate, Bangor City, Cheltenham Town, Wigan Athletic, Tamworth, Boston United, Hendon and Rhyl.

Ties

Replays

2nd replays

3rd replay

4th replay

5th replay

1971–72 FA Cup
See 1971–72 FA Cup for details of the rounds from the First Round Proper onwards.

External links
 Football Club History Database: FA Cup 1971–72
 FA Cup Past Results

Qualifying Rounds
FA Cup qualifying rounds